José Félix Soto (born May 5, 1992), is a Mexican professional boxer in the lightweight division.

Professional career
In November 2010, Félix beat the veteran Jesus Alberto Felix by technical knockout in the second round, the bout was held at Guaymas, Sonora, Mexico.

Professional boxing record

|- style="margin:0.5em auto; font-size:95%;"
|align="center" colspan=8|36 Wins (28 knockouts), 3 Losses 1 Draw
|- style="margin:0.5em auto; font-size:95%;"
|align=center style="border-style: none none solid solid; background: #e3e3e3"|Res.
|align=center style="border-style: none none solid solid; background: #e3e3e3"|Record
|align=center style="border-style: none none solid solid; background: #e3e3e3"|Opponent
|align=center style="border-style: none none solid solid; background: #e3e3e3"|Type
|align=center style="border-style: none none solid solid; background: #e3e3e3"|Rd., Time
|align=center style="border-style: none none solid solid; background: #e3e3e3"|Date
|align=center style="border-style: none none solid solid; background: #e3e3e3"|Location
|align=center style="border-style: none none solid solid; background: #e3e3e3"|Notes
|-align=center   
|Loss || 36-3-1 ||align=left| Marcos Villasana Jr.
|TKO || 9  || April 14, 2018 ||align=left| Arena Oasis, Cancun, Mexico
|align=left|
|-align=center
|Win || 36-2-1 ||align=left| Jairo Lopez
|TKO ||4  || December 16, 2017 ||align=left| Grand Oasis Resort, Cancun, Mexico
|align=left|
|-align=center
|Lose|| 35-2-1 ||align=left| Jonathan Maicelo
|UD ||10  || February 17, 2017 ||align=left|Don Haskins Convention Center, El Paso, Texas
|align=left|
|-align=center

References

External links

1992 births
Boxers from Sinaloa
Super-featherweight boxers
Lightweight boxers
Living people
Sportspeople from Los Mochis
Mexican male boxers